Mpho Osei Tutu (born 31 December 1981), is a French-born South African actor and voice artist of Ghanaian-Mosotho descent. He is best known for his roles in the films and television serials: Seriously Single, Mrs Right Guy and The Jakes Are Missing. Apart from acting, he is also a screenwriter, director and producer. Tutu also starred as the leading character of the South African 2018 series called The Imposter which was the second boy's vision following the first girl's vision, he played the role of Tebogo and Gary Mokoena.

Personal life
He was born on 31 December 1981 in Paris, France to a Ghanaian father and Mosotho mother. Due to being of multinational origin, he has lived in several countries: Lesotho, France, England, Togo and Ghana. In 1992, his family settled in South Africa. He started drama at the age of eight. He later obtained a B.A. (Hons) degree in Dramatic Art from Wits University.

He is married to Tumi Morake, a fellow actress, comedian and writer. They married on 28 November 2009. The couple has three children.

Career
He started acting in theater where he played several acting roles in the plays Zakes Mda's The Mother Of All Eating, Pieter-Dirk Uys' MacBeki, Paul Slabolepsky's For Your Ears Only, The Island. With the latter, he has toured the UK, the US and Greece. Then he made Getting it On which won Best Overall Short Cut Award at the Multi Choice VUKA! Awards in 2006. Then he played multiple characters in his self-penned Convincing Carlos in which he received an inaugural Standard Bank Ovation Award in 2010. For the role 'La Fleche' in Sylvaine Strike's play The Miser he won the Best Play at the 2013 Naledi Theatre Awards.

Meanwhile, he joined television, acting in several sitcoms Kota Life Crisis, High Rollers, Samsokolo; for which he was nominated for Best Actor in TV Comedy at the 2014 SAFTAs. Then he starred as 'Desmond' in the International Emmy Nominated serial Home Affairs. Then he featured with the role 'Bomba' in the internationally acclaimed feature film A Million Colors. He was also nominated for Best Supporting Actor in a Feature Film at the 2013 SAFTAs for this film. He is also a popular voice artist where he rendered his voice in several radio stations.

Apart from acting, he also worked as a screenwriter for the television series Ses Top La, Tempy Pushas, My Perfect Family where he nominated for Best Writing in a TV Comedy at 2014 SAFTAs, as well as Rhythm City which won the award for the Best Writing in a TV Soap at the SAFTAs in 2009., In 2010, he wrote Hopeville and nominated for an International Emmy Award in 2010. Meanwhile, he also excelled as a director with the films Zone 14, Ga Re Dumele 4 and Kota Life Crisis.

He later co-produced the short film Joburg which was officially selected for Sundance Film Festival in 2010. He founded the film production company, 'What Not Entertainment' and later produced 2 Seasons of the sitcom Kota Life Crisis for Mzansi Magic. From 2012 to 2014, he served on the board of The South African Guild of Actors (SAGA). In the meantime, he was the organizer of the Repertory Amateur Players Society (RAPS) One Act Plays Festival, which is regarded as the longest running and most prestigious high school's drama festival in South Africa.

In August 2020, he starred in the sex comedy film Seriously Single co-directed by Katleho Ramaphakela and Rethabile Ramaphakela. It was released on July 31, 2020, on Netflix.

Partial filmography

References

External links
 

Living people
South African male film actors
South African male television actors
1981 births